Devin Singletary (born September 3, 1997), nicknamed "Motor", is an American football running back who plays for the Houston Texans. He played college football at Florida Atlantic. As a sophomore in 2017, he led all Division I FBS players with 32 rushing touchdowns, 33 combined rushing and receiving touchdowns, and 198 points scored, and finished with 1,920 rushing yards.

Early years
Singletary attended and played high school football at American Heritage School in Delray Beach, Florida. He became a three-star recruit and amassed 4,975 rushing yards during his high school career, earning two First-Team All-State selections, before choosing to go to Florida Atlantic University. Singletary's childhood nickname "Motor", which he shared with his father, Jebedial-Danielson Singletary along with uncle Lil’Jordan Humphrey, stuck with him during his high school football years.

College career
During the 2016 season, he rushed for 1,021 yards on 152 carries for an average of 6.7 yards per carry, gaining 12 touchdowns.

As a sophomore in 2017, he rushed for 244 yards against Western Kentucky and 203 yards against Marshall. During the 2017 regular season, he led all Division I FBS players with 162 points scored (27 touchdowns) and ranked fourth with 1,632 rushing yards. He also set the Florida Atlantic single-season record for rushing yardage. He was also selected as a semifinalist for the Doak Walker Award.

On December 2, 2017, in the Conference USA championship game against North Texas, Singletary rushed for an additional 164 yards and three touchdowns. He added three more touchdowns in the Owls' 50–3 blowout of Akron in the 2017 Boca Raton Bowl, raising his total touchdown count for the year to 33 (32 rushing, 1 receiving).

Singletary rushed for 22 touchdowns the following season with 1,348 rushing yards on 261 attempts. He was named a second-team All-American by Sporting News for his performance. On December 12, 2018, Singletary announced his intention to enter the 2019 NFL draft, finishing his college career as FAU's all-time rusher and with the sixth-most rushing touchdowns in FBS history.

College statistics

Professional career

Singletary was drafted by the Buffalo Bills with the 74th overall pick in the third round of the 2019 NFL Draft. He joined a backfield with veterans LeSean McCoy, Frank Gore, and T. J. Yeldon, but earned a prominent role with the Bills after McCoy was released as part of final preseason cuts.

2019

On September 8, 2019, Singletary made his professional debut for the Buffalo Bills. He finished the game against the New York Jets with 70 rushing yards on four carries, in addition to five receptions for 28 yards as the Bills won 17–16. Singletary scored his first NFL rushing touchdown one week later, during a 28–14 win over the New York Giants. He finished with 57 rushing yards on six carries prior to leaving with a hamstring injury. In Week 9 against the Washington Redskins, Singletary had his breakout game rushing for 95 yards on 20 carries with one touchdown and 45 yards receiving on three receptions in the 24–9 win. In Week 13 against the Dallas Cowboys on Thanksgiving Day, Singletary rushed 14 times for 63 yards and caught three passes for 38 yards, including a 28-yard touchdown reception from wide receiver John Brown, in the 26–15 win. Overall, he finished the 2019 season with 151 carries for 775 rushing yards and two rushing touchdowns to go along with 29 receptions for 194 receiving yards and two receiving touchdowns.

2020
With the departure of veteran power back Frank Gore in free agency, Buffalo drafted Zack Moss in the 2020 NFL Draft to complement Singletary's elusive running style. Singletary split carries with Moss throughout the season, but finished as Buffalo's top rusher in 2020. He attained 687 yards and two touchdowns on 156 carries, with his longest run being a 51-yard touchdown against the Denver Broncos in Week 15, and also caught 38 passes for 269 yards. He also fumbled the ball just once, compared to four times during his rookie season.

2021
Singletary scored his first touchdown of the season in week 2 against the Miami Dolphins, a 46-yard scamper, in which he reached a top speed of 20.29 miles per hour according to NFL NextGen Stats. His touchdown was the first for Buffalo in the game, as the Bills wound up winning 35–0. Throughout the first three months of the season, Singletary shared the backfield with Moss and free agent acquisition Matt Breida to middling results behind a poor run-blocking offensive line, before he was made the primary halfback. Between weeks 14 and 18, he accrued at least 78 yards from scrimmage against the Tampa Bay Buccaneers, Carolina Panthers, New England Patriots, Atlanta Falcons, and New York Jets. Singletary's 23 carries against Atlanta resulted in 110 yards and 2 touchdowns, both career-highs for a single game. He scored two touchdowns again versus the Jets, with one on the ground and one receiving.

In the playoffs, Singletary rushed for two touchdowns in a 47–17 win over the Patriots during the wild-card round, also scoring the first touchdown of the Divisional round game against the Kansas City Chiefs, which Buffalo lost 42–36 in overtime.

2022
The Bills drafted running back James Cook prior to the season, but despite a now-crowded backfield, Singletary remained the top back on the roster. Singletary's first touchdown from scrimmage in the 2022 season came on a two-yard pass from Josh Allen during a week 3 game against the Dolphins. His first two rushing touchdowns of the season came during a 33–30 overtime loss to the Minnesota Vikings, but he also lost a fumble during the game.

NFL career statistics

Regular season

Postseason

References

External links

Buffalo Bills bio
FAU Owls bio

1997 births
Living people
People from Deerfield Beach, Florida
Sportspeople from Broward County, Florida
African-American players of American football
Players of American football from Florida
American football running backs
Buffalo Bills players
Florida Atlantic Owls football players
21st-century African-American sportspeople